This article lists the major power stations located in Fujian Province.

Non-renewable

Coal based

Natural gas based

Nuclear

Renewable

Hydroelectric

Conventional

Pumped-storage

Wind
Fujian has rich resource of wind power. By 2008, there is more than 450MW of operational and underconstructed wind electricity power capacity, and it is projected to reach 3,000MW by 2020.

References 

Power stations
Fujian